The 2001–02 National Soccer League season, was the 26th season of the National Soccer League in Australia.  Prior to the start of the season, Canberra Cosmos and Eastern Pride were removed from the competition, reducing the league to 13 teams.  The league premiership was won by Perth Glory and the championship won by Olympic Sharks.

Regular season

League table

Finals series

Bracket

Elimination Final 1

Elimination Final 2

Major semi Final

Minor semi Final

Preliminary Final

Grand Final

Individual awards

Player of the Year: Fernando Rech (Brisbane Strikers)
U-21 Player of the Year: Joseph Schirripa (Newcastle United)
Top Scorer(s): Damian Mori (Perth Glory – 17 goals)
Coach of the Year: Ian Crook (Newcastle United)

References

OzFootball Archives - 2001–02 NSL Season

National Soccer League (Australia) seasons
1
1
Aus
Aus